Shock Treatment is a 1981 American musical comedy film directed by Jim Sharman, and co-written by Sharman and Richard O'Brien. It is a follow-up to the 1975 film The Rocky Horror Picture Show.

While not an outright sequel, the film does feature several characters from the previous film, most portrayed by different actors, as well as several Rocky Horror actors in new roles. The film stars Jessica Harper as Janet and Cliff DeYoung in a dual role as Brad and the film's main antagonist Farley Flavors, with O'Brien and Patricia Quinn playing sibling character actors.

Given a limited release on the midnight movie circuit beginning on October 30, 1981, Shock Treatment was a critical and commercial failure, not earning the same level of cult film status its predecessor received, but contemporary reviews have since praised its satirical themes, particularly a prescient satire of reality television. In 2015, the film was adapted as a stage production in London.

Plot
Continuing from The Rocky Horror Picture Show are the characters of Brad and Janet Majors (now portrayed by Cliff DeYoung and Jessica Harper), now married. The film takes place in the town of Denton, USA, which has been taken over by fast food magnate Farley Flavors (also DeYoung). The town of Denton is entirely encased within a television studio for the DTV (Denton Television) network. Residents are either stars and regulars on a show, cast and crew, or audience members. Brad and Janet, seated in the audience, are chosen to participate in the game show Marriage Maze by the kooky, supposedly blind host Bert Schnick (Barry Humphries). As a "prize", Brad is imprisoned on Dentonvale, a soap opera that centers upon the local mental hospital run by brother and sister Cosmo and Nation McKinley (Richard O'Brien and Patricia Quinn).

Janet is given a taste of showbiz as Farley molds her into a singing diva superstar in an attempt to take her away from Brad. Her compliance is assured through the use of drugs supplied by the McKinleys. Betty Hapschatt (Ruby Wax) and Judge Oliver Wright (Charles Gray) investigate Farley and other people involved in DTV and  eventually discover that Cosmo and Nation are not doctors, but merely deranged character actors, and Farley Flavors is Brad's jealous, long-lost twin brother, seeking to destroy Brad and take Janet for himself. The pair rescue Brad from Dentonvale and have him confront his twin on his show Faith Factory. Farley imprisons the three and Janet, but they manage to escape in a car along with a local band while the remainder of Denton's citizens follow Farley and commit themselves to Dentonvale.

Cast

 Jessica Harper as Janet Majors (née Weiss)
 Cliff DeYoung as Brad Majors / Farley Flavors
 Richard O'Brien as Dr. Cosmo McKinley
 Patricia Quinn as Dr. Nation McKinley
 Little Nell as Nurse Ansalong
 Charles Gray as Judge Oliver Wright
 Barry Humphries as Bert Schnick
 Ruby Wax as Betty Hapschatt (née Munroe)
 Jeremy Newson as Ralph Hapschatt
 Wendy Raebeck as Macy Struthers
 Rik Mayall as "Rest Home" Ricky
 Darlene Johnson as Emily Weiss
 Manning Redwood as Harry Weiss
 Barry Dennen as Irwin Lapsey
 Betsy Brantley as Neely Pritt
 Chris Malcolm as Officer Vance Parker
 Eugene Lipinski as Kirk
 Gary Shail as Oscar Drill
 Claire Toeman as Brenda Drill
 Donald Waugh as Glitch Davidson
 David John as 'Bit' Drummer
 Gary Martin as 'Bit' Guitarist
 Sinitta Renet as Frankie
 Sal Piro (uncredited) as Guy on Pay Phone

Soundtrack
Coinciding with the release of the film, Ode Records issued the soundtrack album on vinyl and cassette in 1981, and later reissued it on CD in 1994. The album includes longer versions of "Thank God I'm a Man" and "Carte Blanche", as well as two unlisted bits taken directly from the film, the Farley Flavors "commercial break" (after "Denton U.S.A.") and the rhyming dialogue, which directly precedes "Duel Duet" (after "Breaking Out").

All editions are missing Richard O'Brien's solo version of the title song (which plays during the end credits and features backing vocals by Nell Campbell), though it was released as a 7" vinyl single, and included on the CD Songs from the Vaults: A Collection of Rocky Horror Rarities, which was exclusive to the Rocky Horror Picture Show 15th Anniversary boxed set.

Charts

Production

Development
Following the unexpected and overwhelming success of The Rocky Horror Picture Show on the midnight circuit, Richard O'Brien approached producer Michael White with the idea of making a sequel. In 1978, he began work on a script titled Rocky Horror Shows His Heels, which found Frank and Rocky resurrected, Brad and Dr. Scott turned gay, and Janet on the verge of giving birth to Frank's baby. Director Jim Sharman was resistant to revisit the material and Tim Curry had no desire to reprise the role of Frank, but O'Brien had put some work into the songs, so he decided to retain them and simply revise the story.

The new script was titled The Brad and Janet Show. This version is closer to what ultimately became Shock Treatment and was planned to be produced, but the filmmakers were plagued with a variety of problems. Dr. Scott had been included in the script, but Jonathan Adams was not interested in reprising his role. The filmmakers intended to shoot on location in Denton, Texas, but production screeched to a halt in 1980 when the Screen Actors Guild went on strike.

With only a small window when cast and crew were available, the filmmakers had to get creative. Television had been a heavy motif in the script, so production designer Brian Thomson came up with the notion to rework the story and set it in a giant TV studio, utilizing a film studio in England, which shaved $1 million from the budget and gave them the luxury of working in a controlled environment. The script endured a final draft in which all of the locations were changed to television shows, and the role of Dr. Scott morphed into game show host Bert Schnick. "I was frightened the strike was going to finish too soon and we'd have to go back to our original conception," commented O'Brien.

Casting
Many Rocky Horror cast members returned for the film, but only Jeremy Newson reprised his role as Ralph Hapschatt. Many of the original film's Transylvanians appeared as audience members, while Imogen Claire was given the slightly-larger part of the Wardrobe Mistress. Raynor Bourton, who originated the role of Rocky in the stage production, portrayed one of the singing soldiers in "Thank God I'm a Man", and Chris Malcolm, who originated the role of Brad Majors, was cast as Vance Parker, a local police officer. Founder and long-time president of Rocky Horror fan club, Sal Piro, also has a silent cameo appearance as the man using the payphone during the opening sequence.

With her career on the rise, Susan Sarandon demanded more money than the budget allowed.  Auditions were held at The Roxy theater to find a suitable replacement, and Jessica Harper, previously of Brian De Palma's cult musical Phantom of the Paradise, impressed the filmmakers with her singing skills.

Cliff DeYoung had been Sharman's original choice for Brad in The Rocky Horror Picture Show after they worked together on the 1972 off-Broadway play Trials of Oz, but DeYoung was starring on the television series Sunshine in California and was unable to appear. Upon learning that Bostwick was unable to participate in Shock Treatment, Sharman tracked down DeYoung and gave him the role.  This afforded DeYoung the opportunity to reunite with Harper, with whom he had co-starred in a stage production of Hair.

Filming
As is standard with musicals, music and vocals were recorded prior to principal photography at the renowned Abbey Road Studios. The first scene shot was the Farley Flavors commercial break with Macy Struthers and a group of children. Wendy Raebeck was ill and collapsed after one of her takes.

DeYoung modeled his performance of Brad after David Eisenhower and based Farley on Jack Nicholson. The elaborate opening shot begins on Farley in the overhead video booth, and the camera slowly does a 360° pan around the room as the crew prepares for the show and Brad and Janet enter the studio. For this scene, DeYoung had to do a quick change and quickly run downstairs to hit his second mark. "Duel Duet" was shot over the course of a day, with DeYoung spending the morning shooting his scenes as one character and the remainder of the day costumed as the other. He began with a very restrained performance of the song but was encouraged to go broader and was pleased with the final result.

Reception
In spite of pre-release hype (including a promotional TV special called The Rocky Horror Treatment), the film was both a critical and commercial failure when it was released only as a midnight movie on Halloween 1981. It never received a full general theatrical first-run release. Due to its increased budget and box office failure, Shock Treatment was an even bigger flop than Rocky Horrors original general release in 1975.

Rotten Tomatoes, a review aggregator, reports that 50% of 6 (3 of 6) surveyed critics gave the film a positive review; the average rating is 6.0/10.

In one of his television reviews, Roger Ebert said that he felt Rocky Horror fans would reject a movie that was specifically targeted at them, remarking that "cult film audiences want to feel that they have seen the genius of something that everybody else hates. They discovered this film, they know it's good, everyone else thinks it's garbage." Shock Treatment was quickly dismissed by most Rocky Horror enthusiasts who were confused by the re-casting of the leads, put off by the fact that Tim Curry did not participate, and resented Richard O'Brien's infamous tagline, "It's not a sequel... it's not a prequel... it's an equal" (O'Brien later recanted, frequently criticizing the film by going so far as to refer to it as "an abortion"). Gradually, however, Shock Treatment did build up a cult following all its own and, as Ebert wrote, many contemporary reviewers remark that it was initially condemned in part because it was too ahead of its time, being a prescient satire of reality television.

A rough script written by O'Brien emerged for a direct sequel to Rocky Horror called Return of the Old Queen. In the story, Brad's brother Steve seeks revenge on the aliens in the first film after Brad becomes a Las Vegas go-go dancer and falls to his death from a trapeze wearing only six-inch heels and a rhinestone choker. Also revealed is Sonny, the illegitimate son of Janet and Frank and heir to the throne of Transexual. The script never made it past early draft stages but has been shared on many fan sites.

Home media
The film first surfaced on VHS in Australia in 1982, and this was quickly followed by other releases around the world on VHS, Betamax and LaserDisc.

A special edition DVD, labeled as the 25th Anniversary Edition, was issued in the United States on September 5, 2006, both as a stand-alone release and packaged with the 2-disc Rocky Horror special edition. Special features include an audio commentary with fan club presidents Mad Man Mike and Bill Brennan, a making-of featurette, a music retrospective featurette, and domestic and international trailers.

Virtually every home video edition has suffered from audio flaws. VHS and Beta editions included warbling anomalies during the Overture and Farley's Song, which briefly knocked the sound out of sync.  All DVD releases include a brief sound dropout before the last chorus of Denton U.S.A., and a chunk of the end credit Overture has been lopped off to prematurely fade into the single version of Shock Treatment. The original version features the complete Overture playing over the credits, with Shock Treatment continuing over a black screen as exit music. This edit shortens the film's running time from 94 to 92 minutes.

In 2017, the British label Arrow Video released the film on Blu-ray in the UK which featured a new commentary with Quinn and Little Nell, as well as "The Rocky Horror Treatment". It has not received a Blu-ray release in the States.

Stage adaptation

Production
Starting in the mid 2000s director Benji Sperring, a fan of the film, pursued Richard O'Brien for nearly a decade trying to acquire the rights to produce a stage adaptation. O'Brien finally relented and gave his consent, stipulating that it had to be staged in a very small, intimate venue, as the original The Rocky Horror Show had been.  On this proviso, the show wound up at the King's Head Theatre in Islington, London, where artistic director Adam Spreadbury-Maher made the suggestion that Tom Crowley adapt the script.  Crowley had never seen the film, and read the screenplay first to prepare for his interview. He was initially apprehensive about the project, but Sperring's vision was so concise that he agreed. It was reported that O'Brien adapted and produced the show, but he remained fairly hands-off.  O'Brien, co-composer Richard Hartley and Sperring agreed on the story's direction prior to scripting, and they consulted primarily through email during the rest of the production process.

Sperring and Crowley reworked the story, eliminating most of the supporting and peripheral characters.  "A big point of inspiration for me came from the screenplay that became Shock Treatment, The Brad and Janet Show," commented Crowley, "wherein the major factor in Brad and Janet's marital difficulties was that Janet had just been promoted at the local TV studio and Brad had just lost his job."

"The biggest shock is that in the original movie, there isn't any shock treatment," Sperring remarked.  "They don't really explore that, so we've put that back in."

The production premiered at the King's Head theatre in Islington, London in the United Kingdom in the spring of 2015.

Cast
Julie Atherton as Janet Majors
Ben Kerr as Brad Majors
Mark Little/Pete Gallagher as Farley Flavours
Mateo Oxley as Ralph Hapschatt
Rosanna Hyland as Betty Hapschatt
Nic Lamont as Nation McKinley
Adam Rhys-Davies as Cosmo McKinley

Reception
The Daily Telegraph wrote "this sequel to The Rocky Horror Show can't match the original but still provides deliriously silly entertainment"; The Stage singled out Mark Little as being scarcely able to carry a tune, but Carrie Dunn wrote in her review for Broadway World, "his sheer charisma and presence is absolutely perfect."

See also
 Rocky Horror sequels and other media

References

External links

 
 

1980s black comedy films
1980s musical comedy films
1981 films
20th Century Fox films
American black comedy films
American independent films
American musical comedy films
American rock musicals
American sequel films
Films directed by Jim Sharman
Films set in psychiatric hospitals
Films set in the United States
Films shot in London
Incest in film
Rocky Horror
1981 comedy films
1980s English-language films
1980s American films